Shila Ahmed (Bengali: শিলা আহমেদ) is a Bangladeshi television and film actress. She won Bangladesh National Film Award for Best Child Artist Award for her performance in Aguner Poroshmoni (1994).

Early life and career
Ahmed was born to writer Humayun Ahmed and Gultekin Khan.

Ahmed was involved in acting in television from her childhood. She is notable for her role in television dramas such as Kothao Keu Nei, Aaj Robibar and Nokkhotrer Raat.

Personal life
Ahmed married her friend Apu. Later, they were divorced and she married Asif Nazrul, a professor of Department of Law at the University of Dhaka.

Works
Television

Films

References

External links
 

Living people
Bangladeshi film actresses
Bangladeshi television actresses
20th-century Bangladeshi actresses
Best Child Artist National Film Award (Bangladesh) winners
Year of birth missing (living people)
Place of birth missing (living people)
Children of Humayun Ahmed
Family of Humayun Ahmed